Edwalton railway station served the village and district of Edwalton in the English county of Nottinghamshire. It was opened on the Midland Railway Manton direct route between London and Nottingham, avoiding Leicester.

History 
The station was opened for goods on 1 November 1879 and to passengers on 2 February 1880 by the Midland Railway. The station was designed by the Midland Railway company architect John Holloway Sanders.

It also improved access to and from the iron-ore fields in Leicestershire and Rutland.

The list of station masters included: 

The station closed on 28 July 1941.

Present day 
Following the closure of the line as a through-route in 1968, the line between Melton Mowbray and Edwalton was converted for use as the Old Dalby Test Track. This was used initially for the Advanced Passenger Train project and, more recently, Class 390 Pendolino units. It was also used for testing London Underground 'S Stock' trains.

Edwalton itself was never part of the test track, the line stopping short at the A606 road bridge.

The site today has an up market housing development built upon it.

References

External links
 Edwalton station scenes down the years

Disused railway stations in Nottinghamshire
Former Midland Railway stations
Railway stations in Great Britain opened in 1880
Railway stations in Great Britain closed in 1941
John Holloway Sanders railway stations